Murari Rao Ghorpade (1699-1779), known simply as Murari Rao, was an army general in the Maratha Army from Gooty who administered the fort of Tiruchirappalli and surrounding areas from 1741 to 1743. His administration marks the only period of Maratha occupation in Tiruchirappalli. Murari Rao occupied Tiruchirappalli at the head of a strong Maratha army after defeating and imprisoning the Carnatic general Chanda Sahib. However, he was forced to relinquish the fort after administering it for a period of two years.

Murari Rao also fought in battles against Hyder Ali and Tipu Sultan. He was the ruler of Sandur State till its annexation by the Mysore Sultanate.     Murari Rao Ghorpade was the founder of the Ghati Subramanya Temple and the Makalidurga Fort
Have ruled

Warriors of the Maratha Empire
1699 births
1779 deaths